Vorotynsk is the name of several inhabited localities in Russia.

Urban localities 
Vorotynsk (urban-type settlement), Babyninsky District, Kaluga Oblast

Rural localities 
Vorotynsk, Peremyshlsky District, Kaluga Oblast, a former ancient Russian city
Vorotynsk, Oryol Oblast, a selo in Lyutovsky Selsoviet of Livensky District of Oryol Oblast

Air base
Vorotynsk (air base)

See also
 Vorotynsky District, an administrative district of Nizhny Novgorod Oblast
 Vorotynsky, a Rurikid princely house of Muscovite Russia